Levon Hayrapetyan (born 17 April 1989), also known as Levon Hairapetian, is an Armenian football player who currently plays defender for German club SV Grün-Weiß Beckedorf. 

He is the son of Olympic medal winning field hockey player Sos Hayrapetyan.

Club career
Hayrapetyan is the pupil of the German school of football. He played in the amateur Bramefeldere 1945 club and the youth team of Hamburger SV. As part of Hamburger SV II, he spent seven games. Hayrapetyan also played four matches for Pyunik Yerevan. Pyunik won the 2010 Armenian Premier League with Levon a member of the club. In January 2011, he signed a contract with Polish club Lechia Gdańsk for a half-year deal.

On 5 June 2019, Hayrapetyan was released by FC Alashkert. In December 2019 it was confirmed, that Hayrapetyan would return to Germany for 2020 to play for SV Grün-Weiß Beckedorf.

International career
He played as a member of the Armenia U-19 junior and Armenia U-21 youth teams.

On 9 February 2011, Hayrapetyan made his debut in the Armenia national football team in a friendly match with Georgia. Levon suffered an injury on 11 September 2012 in a 2014 FIFA World Cup qualification away match against Bulgaria and underwent knee surgery in Munich. Hayrapetyan stated the operation went successful. He will be able to play again in about four months.

International goals
Scores and results list Armenia's goal tally first.

Personal life
Levon is the son of field hockey Olympic medalist Sos Hayrapetyan. His father helped him in training. Hayrapetyan also holds German citizenship. His father moved to Hamburg when Levon was a child in order to play and coach for field hockey club Uhlenhorster HC.

Honours
Pyunik Yerevan
Armenian Premier League (1): 2010

References

External links
 
 
 Profile on FFA's website
 
 
 armfootball.tripod.com
 Levon Hayrapetyan at FuPa

1989 births
Living people
Footballers from Yerevan
Armenian footballers
Armenia international footballers
Association football fullbacks
Armenian expatriate footballers
Armenian Premier League players
Ekstraklasa players
Persian Gulf Pro League players
Czech First League players
Regionalliga players
Hamburger SV players
FC Pyunik players
Lechia Gdańsk players
Widzew Łódź players
1. FK Příbram players
Paykan F.C. players
FC Alashkert players
Expatriate footballers in Germany
Expatriate footballers in Poland
Expatriate footballers in Iran
Expatriate footballers in the Czech Republic
Armenian expatriate sportspeople in Germany
Armenian expatriate sportspeople in Poland
Armenian expatriate sportspeople in Iran
Armenian expatriate sportspeople in the Czech Republic